Mixed team

Jean Pierre M. J. de Madre, Comte de Loos (17 September 1862 – 2 January 1934) was a French polo player who competed in the 1900 Summer Olympics.

Biography
He was born in Meudon and died in Paris. In 1900 he was part of the BLO Polo Club Rugby polo team which won the silver medal.

Tigers Polo Team 
Johnny was the patron of the Tigers Polo Team; the team traveled between America, England, India and continental Europe playing tournaments. Some of their most important wins being the 1912 Paris Open and the 1923 Coronation Cup in England, they were also winners of the Roehampton Trophy in 1911. The team were well known for their immaculate turn out and attention to detail, the team shirts were pure silk hand embroidered with Gold thread. As well as this Johnny insisted that all four players would ride horses of matching colours e.g. bays in the first chukka, greys in the second, chestnuts in the third etc.

Some of the most notable players to be enlisted to play for Tigers included Indian 10 goalers Jaswant Singh and Jagindar Singh.

References

External links

Polo tournament 1900

1862 births
1934 deaths
French polo players
Roehampton Trophy
Polo players at the 1900 Summer Olympics
Olympic polo players of France
Olympic silver medalists for France
Medalists at the 1900 Summer Olympics
Olympic medalists in polo